One of Our Own is a 2007 independent drama film directed by Abe Levy.

Plot
A married couple, Stellan (Josh Randall) and Diane (Claire Rankin), enlist a surrogate named Cathy (Kate Beahan), to bear their child. The situation is complicated when Stellan's boss Bob (Matthew Lillard) falls in love with Cathy.

Reception
One of Our Own was not given a commercial release, as financial backers insisted on edits which were unpalatable to director Levy and star Lillard. An unmodified version was shown at film festivals in 2007 and 2008.

Ken Eisner of Variety compared the film to Who's Afraid of Virginia Woolf?, writing:

References

External links
 

2007 films
American drama films
American independent films
2000s English-language films
Films directed by Abe Levy
2000s American films